The Convent of the Institute of the Blessed Virgin at Micklegate Bar, York, better known as The Bar Convent Living Heritage Centre, is the oldest surviving Catholic convent in England, established in 1686. The laws of England at this time prohibited the foundation of Catholic convents and as a result of this, the convent was both established and operated in secret. Frances Bedingfeld, a member of the Sisters of Loreto (also known as the IBVM), signed the deeds for the land the convent was to be built upon on 5 November 1686 under the alias Frances Long.

Today, the Bar Convent is a popular York destination for tourists and offers bed and breakfast accommodation, meeting rooms, a gift shop, café and museum exhibition about the Convent's history.

History

Origin and early years
The creation of the Convent was inspired, at least in part  by Sir Thomas Gascoigne, a fervent Catholic who declared "we must have a school for our daughters". Gascoigne even went as far as providing a gift of £450, part of which purchased a property on the Convent site and a boarding school, and day school, for Catholic girls was set up at the site by the nuns.

The order was a target for frequent discrimination, leading in 1694 to the incarceration of Mother Frances and her great niece in Ousebridge Gaol. They were released shortly after but two years later, in 1696, the house was attacked and severely damaged by an angry mob. The engraving of St Michael over the front door is to commemorate this, with a local legend stating that St Michael appeared over the house riding a horse and the mob, terrified, fled the scene.

The convent later came under attack from Doctor Jaques Sterne, a religious campaigner who ordered the convent be shut down and the children at the school sent home. The situation culminated in Mother Hodshon and a colleague being summoned before the Spiritual Court to answer charges of not receiving Anglican holy communion at Holy Trinity Church. The case fell apart, largely due to no service being carried out that day and was thrown out. Doctor Sterne would go on to become a staunch ally and supporter of the Convent following this incident.

Mother Bedingfeld was recalled to Germany in 1699 and the original intention was that Mary Portington would succeed her. However, a family lawsuit made it politically difficult for Portington to take the post and the role fell instead to Dorothy Bedingfield (née Baston), whose reign coincided with a period of intense poverty and this, combined with her own unpopularity, meant that her 34-year reign was turbulent.

18th century
Under Mother Ann Aspinal, the convent was expanded and rebuilt, culminating in the original property being effectively demolished and rebuilt with the order moving to a neighbouring house for two years. The foundation stone for the new house was laid on 4 March 1766 and the house was covered by December 1768. Mother Aspinal also presided over the construction of what is described in the building licence as, "A new front wall to her house". What Mother Aspinal built was an entire extra level to the house, a Georgian Facade that added an extra set of rooms to the front of the house. A copy of the licence, granted by Lord Peter Johnson, then Mayor, can be viewed in the Convent's archives.

The most significant addition to the new Convent was a Chapel. Mother Aspinal initially wanted the design to reflect Roman churches and hired Thomas Atkinson, the architect responsible for the Neo Gothic additions to Bishopthorpe Palace to do the work. However, due to the continuing hostility to Catholicism, Atkinson took the decision to modify the initial design, incorporating it into the structure of the house itself.

Instead of the dome Mother Aspinal intended, the dome was concealed beneath a slate roof, meaning it was hidden from the street. Atkinson also built eight different escape routes into the Chapel, to ensure that if the building was stormed, the worshippers would be able to escape. The Chapel was completed in 1769.

The passing of the First Catholic Repeal Act in 1778 made life easier for the Convent as it allowed them to practise legally and legalised Catholic schools. This led to a new climate of religious freedom within Britain that allowed the nuns to wear the religious habit for the first time since the creation of the Convent. The passing of the Roman Catholic Relief Act 1791 in turn led to the Bar Convent being granted a licence to act as a public place of worship for the first time in its history.

During the Napoleonic Wars the Convent found itself providing shelter to émigré priests from the continent. Mother Superior Catherine Rouby, the Superior at the time, also provided shelter to fugitive nuns including Carmelites from Brabant, Canonesses of the Holy Sepulchre from Liège and Poor Clares from Dunkirk.

Émigré families also sent their daughters to the school and several stayed on to become nuns in the community. The conflict and its aftermath led to the Convent being cut off from the Institute of the Blessed Virgin in Germany. As a result, Mother Superior Elizabeth Coyney petitioned the Pope to have the Convent put under the authority of the Northern Vicar Apostolic, Bishop Gibson.

20th century
Mother Mary Aikenhead, foundress of the Sisters of Charity, was a novice there for three years (1812–1815). The convent was bombed during the Second World War, leading to the death of five nuns and the destruction of the East Wing.

The order continued to maintain a school on the site until 1985, when control was handed over to the Middlesbrough diocese and it was renamed as  All Saints School. The convent, however, is still involved in the Catholic life of the 'Outstanding' academy.

Architecture

Exterior

The main building of the Convent is three storeys tall, with an attic, facing directly onto Blossom Street. The front façade has seven bays, the central three of which stand slightly forward from the others. There are 12-pane sash windows on the ground floor. The one which is directly above the doorcase is set in a shouldered surround with a balustrade below the window and a moulded cornice above it.

At the rear of the building, there is a 3-storey 3-bay pent-roofed extension which houses a square clock tower. The tower itself is crowned with an ogee roofed open cupola and timber columns. The schoolroom block of the main building is 2 storeys tall and has a 3 bay front. The windows are once again 12 pane sashes with differences in size and moulding between the first and second floors. All the windows have flat arches of rubbed brick.

Interior
The Entrance Hall to the main building was initially built as an open courtyard but has since been enclosed and Victorian tiles added. The court has a decorative tiled floor and a glass roof supported by iron trusses which are, in turn, supported by iron columns. The court also houses a clock, designed by Henry Hindley. It was connected in around 1970 to the pediment clock on the building's frontage, on Blossom Street. The Great Parlour, which features paintings of some of the notable early sisters of the Convent, is located to the right of the ground floor and has a marble fireplace with round headed alcoves to each side.

Chapel
The Chapel block is two storeys tall and has two attics. It has a 5-bay front end that is masked by extensions housing the Lady Chapel and a staircase. The ground floor has two windows containing 4 round-headed Gothic lights, while the first floor has three windows with central pivoted lights.

The Chapel's interior houses a stone staircase with square iron balusters that leads up to the Chapel on the first floor. The Chapel itself contains a domed sanctuary, a nave with three bays and a north and south transept. The sanctuary is a domed rotunda with eight detached and fluted columns and a frieze depicting features such as vine leaves, urns and posies. The Dome itself has eight bays, each of which features garlands of various fruits and foliage and is topped by a painted glass lantern.

The South transept leads into the Lady Chapel which is lit by a small dome and cupola. Beneath the North transept is a square space which may once have served as a Priest hole. The altar dates from 1969 but uses scrolled legs featuring winged cherub heads from the 18th-century original. Behind the altar is a 20th-century reredos which is topped by 18th-century carved figures of Saint Jerome, Saint Ambrose, Saint Augustine and Saint Gregory which support a Spanish Ivory crucifix.

Present day
The Bar Convent is England's oldest living convent, still home to a resident community of sisters (who belong to the Congregation of Jesus). The Grade I listed buildings were widely renovated in 2015 and now house a museum exploring the history of the convent and the community, as well as a café, meetings rooms and a guest house.

See also
Christina Kenworthy-Browne

References

External links

The Bar Convent Living Heritage Centre

Roman Catholic churches in York
Convents in England
Grade I listed buildings in York
History of York
History of Catholicism in England
Grade I listed convents
Museums in York
Religious museums in England
Christian monasteries established in the 17th century
1686 establishments in England
Sisters of Loreto
Grade I listed churches in York
Blossom Street